Edgar Alan Gordon (March 27, 1902 – January 26, 1936) was an American racecar driver.

Life and career
A postman from Redlands, California who also became a Long Beach night club owner among other things, Gordon took up racing in 1925.

He made nine starts in the AAA-sanctioned national championship from 1932 to 1935 and entered two non-points paying races after that, scoring a win at Oakland Speedway in January 1936.  He drove in the Indianapolis 500 in 1932, 1934, and 1935, but never finished the race, having qualified second in 1935.  A regular at Legion Ascot Speedway, Gordon won the AAA Pacific Coast championship in 1933.

Death
While competing in another AAA non-championship race in January 1936, both Gordon and his riding mechanic, Spider Matlock, were fatally injured in a crash at Ascot which ended racing at the Los Angeles track.

Awards
Gordon was inducted into the National Sprint Car Hall of Fame in 1999.

Indianapolis 500 results

References

1902 births
1936 deaths
People from Redlands, California
Sportspeople from San Bernardino County, California
Sportspeople from Long Beach, California
Racing drivers from San Francisco
Indianapolis 500 drivers
AAA Championship Car drivers
Racing drivers who died while racing
Sports deaths in California